Cesare Adolfo Bocci (born 13 September 1957) is an Italian actor.  Born in Camerino, he has acted in films and on stage, but is best known for his performance as Mimi Augello to Luca Zingaretti's Salvo Montalbano in the television series Il Commissario Montalbano.

He attended acting school in his home town of Camporotondo di Fiastrone, where he was a founding member of Compagnia della Rancia of Tolentino which produced theatre plays.

Moving to Rome, he has had continued success across theatre, cinema and television. He made his cinema debut in 1990, in Silvio Soldini's L'aria serena dell'ovest. After success in Il Commissario Montalbano, he played the role of the doctor Antonio Strains in the first two seasons of Elisa di Rivombrosa. In 2007 he starred in the TV mini series Io e Mamma, and in 2008 played Sergio Danieli in Terapia d'urgenza.

In the theatre, during 2006 and 2007 he played the role of Oscar in the Italian version of Sweet Charity, alongside Lorella Cuccarini. In 2008 in Camerino he played in the re-enactment of Corsa ala spada e Palio as the Duke Da Varano. In 2011/2 he starred in Massimo Romeo Piparo's adaptation of the famous Broadway musical adaptation of the French play La Cage Aux Folles.

In 2012, he debuted as a television presenter on Rai 3 show Il giallo e il nero. In October 2013, he was lead presenter of Miss Italia together with Massimo Ghini and Francesca Chillemi.

External links 

1957 births
Living people
Italian male television actors
Italian male stage actors
People from the Province of Macerata
Italian male film actors
20th-century Italian male actors
21st-century Italian male actors
Reality show winners